The Sankaraparani River (French: Fleuve Sankaraparani) is a river in Tamil Nadu state of southern India. It originates on the western slope of the Gingee Hills in Viluppuram District, and flows southeastwards to empty into the Bay of Bengal south of Pondicherry. The Sankaraparani is also known as Varahanadi or Gingee River.

River course
It has two sources, one in the Pakkamalai hills and one in the mountains of Melmalayanur. They join near Thenpalai village to form the main river. The course of the river is generally southeastwards. Annamangalam surplus joins near Melacheri. Then the river turns south in eastern part of Singavaram village and then flows east again. Second tributary Nariyar Odai joins Sankaraparani near Uranithangal village.

Near Vallam village, the river turns southeast to flow toward of Rettanai, Nedimozhiyanur, towards Veedur Dam. The third tributary Thondiar joins near Vidur. The Vidur reservoir across Sankaraparani is situated just below.

From Vidur reservoir, Sankaraparani flows southeast. Pambaiyar tributary joins near Radhapuram. Then Sankaraparani enters Puducherry Union Territory at Manalipet. Pambai tributary joins Sankaraparani near Sellipet.

Then Guduvaiyar River,  the last tributary joins near Boat House. At this point, Sankaraparani is also called Chunnambar. From here it flows for  before draining into Bay of Bengal at Paradise Beach.

Of the total length,  flows in Puducherry.

Tributaries 
Sankaraparani river has six tributaries namely:
 Annamangalam surplus
 Nariyar Odai
 Thondiar 
 Pambaiyar
 Pambai
 Guduvaiyar

Distributary 
The only distributary of Sankaraparani is Ariyankuppam River that branches near Thirukanchi.

History of a flood in times bygone 
There is a history that there was once great flooding of this river. The exact timing of the flood may need experts in history to tell us. However, the two proofs are: (1) The fossil park at Tiruvakkarai is about 1–2 km away from the river and located on a hillock. The ASI maintained park mentions that there was a great flood once that would have washed away all the logs of trees on the hillock which have been preserved as fossils since then.

(2) A visit to the Gangai Varaha Nadeeswarar Koil at ThiruKaanchi also gave us a similar history (Varalaru) from the priests of the temple. That the village was once severely flooded and the temple was destroyed. The main deities were however saved and the temple rebuilt at the present location.

Temples 
Ancient temples are located on the banks of Sankaraparani. Out of 22 Paadal Petra Sthalam in Nadu Naadu, four temples are located on the banks of Sankaraparani. Among the temples Gangai Varaga Natheeswarar Temple located at Thirukanchi in Puducherry named after this river 'Varaga Nathi'. The name suggests that this river 'Sankaraparani' has the same power as of 'Gangai Nathi' (The River Ganges) as per Hindu Mythology. Every year in the Tamil month of 'Maasi' (Feb-March) during the 'Magam' Nachathiram day this temple festival is celebrated. 'Maasi Magam' - ten days festival is celebrated including car festival on the ninth day.

Villupuram district 
Temples in Villupuram district include:
 Ranganathar Koil, Singavaram 
 Ramanatheeswarar Koil, Esalam 
 Akkarai Kali Amman Koil, Nedi Mozhiyanoor (sd)
 Azhagiyanathar Koil, Thiruvaamaathur (Paadal Petra Sthalam)
 Panankatteesar Koil, Puravar Panankattur (Paadal Petra Sthalam)
 Chandarasekarar Temple, Thiruvakarai (Paadal Petra Sthalam)

Puducherry 
Temples in Puducherry district include:
 Mahedevar Koil, Madagadipet
 Perumal Koil, Thirubhuvanai
 Vadugurnathar Koil, Thiruvandarkoil (Vadukkur)(Paadal Petra Sthalam)
 Thirukameswarar Koil, Villianur
 Gangai Varaha Natheeswarar Koil, Thirukanchi
 Kasi Viswanathar temple, Odhiampattu

Tourism 
 Vidur Reservoir
 Ossudu Lake Boat House, Poraiyur Agaram
 Chunnambar Boat House, Ariyankuppam

Resorts include Le Pondy, Kailash Beach Resort, and The Windflower Resort and Spa

See also 
 List of rivers of Puducherry
 List of rivers of Tamil Nadu

References 

 
Rivers of Puducherry
Rivers of Tamil Nadu
Viluppuram district
Rivers of India

ta:சங்கரபரணி ஆறு